The 1901 County Championship was the 12th officially organised running of the County Championship, and ran from 6 May to 4 September 1901. Yorkshire County Cricket Club won their fifth championship title, their second title in successive seasons. Middlesex finished in a distant second place.

Table
 One point was awarded for a win, and one point was taken away for each loss. Final placings were decided by dividing the number of points earned by the number of completed matches (i.e. those that ended in a win or a loss), and multiplying by 100.

Records

References

External links

1901 in English cricket
County Championship seasons
County